John Jacob is an American politician and anti-abortion activist serving as a member of the Indiana House of Representatives from the 93rd district. He assumed office on November 4, 2020.

Early life and education 
Jacob was born in Indianapolis. He earned a Bachelor of Science degree in accounting and finance from Indiana University–Purdue University Indianapolis.

Career 
Prior to entering politics, Jacob worked as an auditor for the Indiana State Board of Accounts. He also owned a small business. Jacob was elected to the Indiana House of Representatives in November 2020. Jacob was endorsed by Operation Save America and campaigned on an anti-abortion platform. During his tenure, he authored House Bill 1282, which would ban abortion in Indiana. Jacob was defeated for re-election to the House in the May 2022 Republican primary by Julie McGuire.

On August 4, 2022, during a debate on new abortion restrictions in the Indiana House of Representatives, Jacob said "The body inside of the mom's body is not her body. Let me repeat that: The body inside of the mom's body is not her body. Not her body, not her choice.“

References 

Living people
People from Indianapolis
Politicians from Indianapolis
Auditors
Republican Party members of the Indiana House of Representatives
Indiana University–Purdue University Indianapolis alumni
Anti-abortion activists
Year of birth missing (living people)